Warrego may refer to:

 the Warrego River, which flows from south-west Queensland through north-west New South Wales, until it merges with the Darling River
 the Electoral district of Warrego, an electoral district for the Queensland Legislative Assembly, which encompasses several towns on the Warrego River
 HMAS Warrego, two ships of the Royal Australian Navy named after the river